Duffield may refer to:

England
 Duffield, Derbyshire
 Duffield Castle, Derbyshire, a Norman castle in Duffield, Derbyshire
 Duffield Frith, in medieval times an area of Derbyshire
 North Duffield, a village in North Yorkshire
 South Duffield, a village in North Yorkshire

Other places
 Duffield, Alberta, a hamlet
 Duffield, Michigan
 Duffield, Virginia
 Fort Duffield, an American Civil War fort in Kentucky
 Duffield Street, a street in Brooklyn, New York with abolitionist ties

See also
 Duffield (surname)
 Duffield Castle (disambiguation)